The 2014 MAAC Men's Lacrosse Championship took place from April 1 to May 3 that year at Tenney Stadium in Poughkeepsie, New York, United States. The winner of the tournament received the Metro Atlantic Athletic Conference's automatic bid to the 2014 NCAA Division I Men's Lacrosse Championship. Four teams from the MAAC conference will compete in the single elimination tournament. The seeds were based upon the teams' regular season conference record.

Standings
Only the top four teams in the Metro Atlantic Athletic conference advanced to the MAAC Conference Tournament.

Schedule

Bracket
Tenney Stadium – Poughkeepsie, New York

 denotes an overtime game

All-Tournament
Tim Edwards,	 Canisius

Nick Tuttle,	 Canisius

Shayne Adams,	 Detroit

Alex Maini,	 Detroit

Gannon Osborn,	 Marist

Dave Scarcello,	 Marist

Jordan Barlow,	 Siena

Colin Clive,	 Siena

Kyle Curry,	 Siena

Most Outstanding Player

Tommy Cordts,	 Siena

References 

 Third Time's a Charm; Siena Wins the 2014 MAAC Men's Lacrosse Title

External links
2014 Men's Lacrosse Championship Tournament Page
Schedule / Results 

MAAC men's lacrosse tournament
MAAC men's lacrosse tournament
MAAC men's lacrosse tournament
MAAC men's lacrosse tournament